Articles (arranged alphabetically) related to Nigeria include:

0-9
2012 Nigeria floods

A
Abdu Gusau
Abia State
Abubakar Koko
Abuja
Abule-Ado explosion
Adamawa Plateau
Adamawa State
Advanced-fee fraud
Aisha Halilu
Akwa Ibom State
Anambra State
Area Boys
Atiku Abubakar

B
Bajju people
Bauchi
Bauchi State
Bayelsa State
Bello Mandiya
Benin
Benin Empire
Benue River
Benue State
Biafra
Bight of Benin
Bight of Biafra
Borno State
Borno State University
Boy Scouts of Nigeria

C
Cameroon
Cameroonian Highlands forests
Central African mangroves
Chad
Chad Basin National Park
Cinema of Nigeria
Climate change in Nigeria
Closing of Aba, Nigeria LDS Temple
Communal conflicts in Nigeria
Communications in Nigeria
Cross-Niger transition forests
Cross-Sanaga-Bioko coastal forests
Cross River
Cross River National Park
Cross River State
Culture of Nigeria

D
Delta State
Demographics of Nigeria

E
Economy of Nigeria
Edo State
Elections in Nigeria
Emai people
Enugu State

F
Federal government of Nigeria
Flag of Nigeria
Floods of 2012
Foreign relations of Nigeria
Fred Ajudua

G
Gashaka Gumti National Park
Gombe State
Greenfield University
Guinean forest-savanna mosaic
Guinean Forests of West Africa
Gulf of Guinea
Gwio Kura

H
Hadejia-Nguru wetlands
Hadiza Isma Elrufai
Hadiza Sabuwa Balarabe
Ham People
Hausa Kingdoms
Hausa people
Hausa language 
History of Nigeria
Holidays in Nigeria
Hyam Language

I
Igbo language
Igbo people
Igboid languages
Igboland
Ijaw people
Ijaw languages
Ika people
Imo State

J
Jju language
Jos Plateau

K
Kaduna State
Kaduna State House of Assembly
Kaduna Golf Club
Kaduna Polo Club
Kaduna State Judiciary
Kaduna State Governor
Kainji National Park
Kamerun
Kamuku National Park
Kano State
Kano trovafloxacin trial litigation
Katsina State
Kebbi State
King of Thieves (2022 film)
Kogi State
kulu language
Kwara State

L
Lagos
Lake Chad
Lake Chad flooded savanna
Lancaster House Conferences (Nigeria)
Languages of Nigeria
LGBT rights in Nigeria (Gay rights)
List of cities in Nigeria
List of ecoregions in Nigeria
List of Languages in Nigeria
List of massacres in Nigeria
List of museums in Nigeria
List of Nigerians
List of Nigerian companies
List of Nigerian poets
List of presidents of Nigeria
List of universities in Nigeria
Lists of villages in Nigeria
Lower Guinean forests

M
Maiduguri
Mandara Mountains
Mandara Plateau mosaic
Margi language
Matsirga waterfalls
Millennium Park (Abuja)
Military of Nigeria
Murtala Square

N
National Service in Nigeria
National Space Research and Development Agency
Natural areas in Nigeria
Niger
Niger Delta
Niger River
Niger State
Nigeria
Nigeria Police Force
Nigerian Air Force
Nigerian Armed Forces
Nigerian Army
Nigerian Civil War
Nigerian Naira
Nigeria Football Association
Nigerian general election, 2007
Nigerian general election, 2015
Nigerian Medical Association
Nigerian money transfer fraud
Nigeria national football team
Nigerian Navy
Nigerian parliamentary election, 2011
Nigerian pidgin
Nigerian pound
Nigerian presidential election, 2011
Nigerian Railway Corporation
Nigerian Universities
Nigerians in India
Nnebe
Nok Culture

O
Ogun State
Oil Rivers Protectorate
Okomu National Park
Old Oyo National Park
Oluwa Forest Reserve
Ondo State
Osun State
Oyo State

P
Petroleum industry in Nigeria
Piracy in Nigeria
Polygamy in Nigeria
Port Harcourt
Postal orders of Nigeria
Poverty in Nigeria
President of Nigeria

Q

R
 Rail transport in Nigeria
Religion in Nigeria

S
Sahel
Sahelian Acacia savanna
Shehu Shagari
Sokoto State
Sultan Bello Mosque
Sustainable Development Goals and Nigeria

T
Tafarki Foundation
Taraba State
Transport in Nigeria

U
Urhobo language
Urhobo people

V
Video gaming in Nigeria

W
Wildlife of Nigeria

X

Y
Yankari National Park
Yobe State
Yoruba language
Yoruba people

Z
Zamfara State
Zamfara State lead poisoning epidemic

See also

Lists of country-related topics - similar lists for other countries

 
Nigeria